Fatherland is the third solo album by Bloc Party frontman Kele Okereke. The album was released on 6 October 2017 and was his first solo album released under his full name instead of the professional name of Kele. It also produced by the band's bassist Justin Harris.

Background
The album was a departure from the alternative dance and electro house style of his previous two albums and instead opted for a folk sound inspired by Joni Mitchell, Nick Drake and Elliott Smith. The album focuses on Kele's experiences being a father despite being a gay man as well as reconnecting with his Nigerian heritage. The album features duets from Olly Alexander from synth-pop band Years & Years and Corinne Bailey Rae on the songs "Grounds for Resentment" and "Versions of Us." Kele embarked on his first solo acoustic tour in support of the album in May 2017 in which he played a mixture of the album, previous solo songs and acoustic renditions of Bloc Party songs.

Critical reception

Fatherland received "generally favourable reviews" from critics; at Metacritic which assigns a normalised rating out of 100 to reviews from mainstream critics, the album received an average score of 66 based on 10 reviews. Critics praised Okereke's honest and personal lyrics as well as usage of "tenor sax, soft electric piano and clarinets." Neil Young from AllMusic described the album as "forlorn and delicate" and as remaining "mostly sullen and occasionally sharp in its content, but the instrumentation helps lift the songs from the gloom." He also praised Okereke's restraint and maturation as a songwriter. Leander Hobbs from The Line of Best Fit described the duets with Olly Alexander and Corinne Bailey Rae as showing "that Okereke understands how to add greater texture and contrast to his shaky vocals without resorting to the autotuned experiments of his early career." However, others were critical of the album, with The Observer describing "Okereke's shaky voice" as making the album "far slighter than it might have been." Paste magazine said it was a shame "that what lies behind dozens of layers of metaphorical shrouds, isn’t a bit more poetic and interesting."

Track listing

Personnel 
Credits adapted from Discogs.

 Kele Okereke – lead vocals, lead guitar, songwriting

Additional musicians 
 Olly Alexander – co-lead vocals and songwriting on "Grounds for Resentment"
 Corinne Bailey Rae – co-lead vocals and songwriting on "Versions of Us"
 Bruce Withycombe – brass
 Megan Diana McGeorge – brass
 Paul Brainard – brass
 Scott Van Schoick – brass
 Willie Matheis – brass
 Collette Alexander – cello
 Sean Flynn – guitar

Production 
 Justin Harris – production
 Jeff Stuart Saltzman – mixing
 Nigel Walton – mastering

Design 
 Kele Okereke – photography
 Rachael Wright – photography
 David Drake – photography, art direction, design, layout

References 

Kele Okereke albums
BMG Rights Management albums
2017 albums